Charles Beaumont Howard (1807 – 19 July 1843) was a colonial clergyman in South Australia.

Howard was born in St Peter's Parish, Dublin, Ireland, the son of William Howard, a lieutenant in the Dublin City Corps of the Liberty Rangers. Howard graduated from Trinity College, Dublin with an M.A. in 1836.

Howard was ordained as a deacon in the Anglican Church of Ireland. Howard moved to the diocese of Chester where he was ordained priest, and was curate at Boroughbridge, Yorkshire, and afterwards incumbent of Hambleton. There was no building in Adelaide suitable for the holding of a service, so Howard borrowed a large sail from a ship, with his friend Osmond Gilles, the colonial treasurer, dragged it seven miles from the sea on a hand cart, converted the sail into a tent, and held service in it. A wooden church was afterwards sent out from England, but its frame was so flimsy that Howard decided to have a stone church built. On 26 January 1838 the foundation stone was laid of the Church of the Holy Trinity on North Terrace, Adelaide. For nearly a year he was the only clergyman in South Australia and his only religious controversy was with Bishop Broughton who claimed jurisdiction in the province. Howard laboured alone for his church until 1840, when he was joined by the Revd James Farrell, afterwards Dean of Adelaide.

In July 1843, Howard became ill and was also worried by a demand for the payment of the debt on the church, for which he had made himself jointly responsible. He died in Adelaide on 19 July 1843 leaving a widow and four daughters. Two of Howard's daughters were married at Trinity Church by the Bishop of Adelaide assisted by Farrell (stepfather of the brides) on 22 December 1857. The second daughter, Isabel Barbara Howard, married John Williams and the third daughter, Henrietta Hindmarsh Howard, married Morley Caulfield Saunders.

Howard was well suited to his position. Broad-minded, scholarly, earnest and sympathetic, he was devoted to his work.

References

1807 births
1843 deaths
Australian people of Anglo-Irish descent
Settlers of South Australia
Irish Anglicans
Burials at West Terrace Cemetery